Ercheia chionoptera is a species of moth of the family Erebidae first described by Hamilton Herbert Druce in 1912. It is found in Cameroon.

References

Moths described in 1912
Ercheiini
Moths of Africa
Taxa named by Hamilton Herbert Druce